Kanury Rao also known as Kanury Venkata Subba Rao (born 1958) is an Indian immunologist. He was the head of the Drug Discovery Research Centre (DDRC) at the Translational Health Science and Technology Institute (THSTI) Faridabad. He is known for his studies in the fields of peptide synthesis and cell signaling and  the design of synthetic peptide vaccines. He is an elected fellow of the Indian Academy of Sciences, National Academy of Sciences, India and the Indian National Science Academy. and a recipient of several awards including the Millennium Plaque of Honour of the Indian Science Congress and the National Bioscience Award for Career Development. The Council of Scientific and Industrial Research  awarded him the Shanti Swarup Bhatnagar Prize for Science and Technology, in 1997, for his contributions to biological sciences.

Biography 
Born on 27 September 1958 in the Indian state of Maharashtra, K. V. Subba Rao graduated in science from the University of Pune and before starting his career by joining Malti-Chem Research Centre, Baroda, he secured his master's degree also from the same university in 1979. Subsequently, he did his doctoral studies under Sukhdev at Maharaja Sayajirao University of Baroda and moved to Johns Hopkins University in 1983 for his post-doctoral studies at their Division of Environmental Chemistry where he worked with Miles R. Chedekel. After working for two years there, he joined the laboratory of Fred C. Fox at the University of California and worked there for three more years. Returning to India in 1988, he joined the International Centre for Genetic Engineering and Biotechnology where he held different positions as that of a research scientist (1988–91) and research assistant (1991–94) and was the Group Leader of the Immunology Group (1994-2015).

Legacy 
During his post-doctoral days in the US, Rao's researches were focused on the synthesis of melanin pigments as well as on the carcinoma cells of human breast and the cross-talk between growth factor and steroid receptors. The group led by him is credited with the discovery of a novel subset of IgD receptors on 'naive' B lymphocytes which helped in a wider understanding of antigen-specific B cell selection and amplification. Later, furthering his earlier researches, he worked on designing new synthetic peptide vaccines for Hepatitis B which were reported to generate high immunogenicity in humans. He is also known to have contributed in the pathogenesis of Mycobacterium tuberculosis and in the diagnostics of HIV/AIDS. It was during his period with Virander Singh Chauhan and Ranjan Kumar Nanda at ICGEB, the group developed an electronic nose, a urine test, to monitor the progress of tuberculosis therapy. His current assignments are on the study of plasticity controlling mechanisms in receptor-initiated signaling pathways based on the systems level analysis of the antigen receptor-dependent signal transduction network. His research findings have been published as a number of articles;  .

He chaired U-EXCEL 2012, a task force of the Department of Biotechnology, for the North-eastern region of India and is a member of the Science and Engineering Research Board of the Department of Science and Technology. He is associated with the Institute of Life Sciences, Bhubaneswar as a member of its Scientific Advisory Committee and has delivered lectures on its behalf. He has also served as the president of the Indian Immunology Society from 2004 to 2008.

Awards and honors 
The Indian Academy of Sciences elected Rao as their fellow in 1993 and he became a fellow of the National Academy of Sciences, India, the next year. The Council of Scientific and Industrial Research awarded him the Shanti Swarup Bhatnagar Prize, one of the highest Indian science awards, in 1997 and he received the National Bioscience Award for Career Development in 1999. He was elected by the Indian National Science Academy as a fellow in 2000, the same year as he received the Millennium Plaque of Honour of the Indian Science Congress. He is also a recipient of the Ranbaxy Research Award which he received in 2001.

Selected bibliography

See also 
 Virander Singh Chauhan

Notes

References

External links 
 

Recipients of the Shanti Swarup Bhatnagar Award in Biological Science
1958 births
Living people
Scientists from Maharashtra
Indian immunologists
Indian biochemists
Indian scientific authors
Maharaja Sayajirao University of Baroda alumni
Johns Hopkins University alumni
University of California, Los Angeles alumni
Fellows of the Indian National Science Academy
Fellows of The National Academy of Sciences, India
N-BIOS Prize recipients
20th-century Indian biologists
Telugu people
Savitribai Phule Pune University alumni